Sophie Reid (born 28 August 1997) is an Australian cricketer who plays as a left-handed batter and wicket-keeper for Victoria in the Women's National Cricket League (WNCL) and Melbourne Stars in the Women's Big Bash League (WBBL).

Domestic career
Reid plays grade cricket for Carlton Cricket Club, and in 2022 became the first woman to play in the club's men's section. She made her debut for Victoria on 2 March 2022, against Tasmania in the WNCL, scoring 22 from 30 balls opening the batting. Overall, she played three matches for the side that season. She played nine matches for the side in the 2022–23 Women's National Cricket League season, scoring 195 runs at an average of 21.66. She made her maiden List A half-century in February 2023, scoring 73 against Western Australia. She was also ever-present for Melbourne Stars in the 2022–23 WBBL, scoring 77 runs at an average of 12.83.

References

External links

Cricket Victoria profile

1997 births
Living people
Place of birth missing (living people)
Australian women cricketers
Victoria women cricketers
Melbourne Stars (WBBL) cricketers